Google Mapathon is an annual mapathon event organized by Google that invites the public to make improvements to Google Maps, through the Google Map Maker. The event was held for the first time in 2013 in India, and subsequently in 2014 in Australia. The program ran onto troubled waters in India as it was accused of not sparing even the critical military-sensitive areas.

2013 
The mapathon took place from 12 February to 25 March. Aimed at increasing the amount of local information, prizes, in the form of smartphones and tablets were promised to the top 1000 mappers. Google named Vishal Saini as the winner of the tournament. Saini had mapped the city of Pathankot, which is quite close to military installations. The Survey of India informed the company of its violations of the laws and filed a complaint. Google, however, responded by saying that the company was ready to discuss any concerns. On March 21, the Surveyor-General asked Google to stop the event, stating that it did not take any permission from agency before launching the mapathon.

2014 
The 2014 edition of the contest was held in Australia from March 24 to April 20. The top 315 mappers were given prizes

References 

Mapathon